= Quadromania =

Quadromania is a board game published in 1987 by Red Dragon Games.

== Contents ==
Quadromania is a game in which players score by forming quads from placing blocks of four adjacent colored pieces in rows on a gridded board.

== Reception ==
David Wells reviewed Quadromania for Games International magazine, and gave it 2 stars out of 5, and stated that "Red Dragon's motto is 'I think, therefore I play.' Not Quadromania, I don't!"
